Cameron Leslie  (born 17 January 1990) is a New Zealand paralympics swimmer and wheelchair rugby player.

Career
Leslie was a student at Auckland University of Technology and has a quadruple limb deficiency.

He won the gold medal in the men's 150 m individual medley at the 2008, 2012 and 2016 Summer Paralympics.

In 2013, he won the gold medal in the men's 150 m individual medley, and a bronze medal in the men's 50 m backstroke, at the IPC Swimming World Championships in Montreal. In 2019, he won the gold medal in the men's 50 m backstroke at the World Para Swimming Championships in London. Just prior to this, he helped New Zealand's wheelchair rugby team, the Wheel Blacks, claim a bronze medal at the IWRF Asia-Oceania Championship to qualify for the 2020 Summer Paralympics.

Leslie was made a Member of the New Zealand Order of Merit in the 2009 New Year's Honours, for services to swimming.

Of Māori descent, Leslie affiliates to the Ngāpuhi iwi.

References

External links 
  (archive)
 

1990 births
Living people
Members of the New Zealand Order of Merit
New Zealand male medley swimmers
Paralympic swimmers of New Zealand
Paralympic gold medalists for New Zealand
World record holders in paralympic swimming
Swimmers at the 2008 Summer Paralympics
Swimmers at the 2012 Summer Paralympics
Medalists at the 2008 Summer Paralympics
Medalists at the 2012 Summer Paralympics
S5-classified Paralympic swimmers
New Zealand Māori sportspeople
Ngāpuhi people
Swimmers at the 2016 Summer Paralympics
New Zealand wheelchair rugby players
Medalists at the 2016 Summer Paralympics
Medalists at the World Para Swimming Championships
Paralympic medalists in swimming